Reinhardt Erwee (born 20 January 1988) is a South African professional rugby union player who last played for the  in the Currie Cup. His is a utility back that can play fly-half, fullback, winger or centre.

Career

He joined  prior to the 2013 Currie Cup First Division season.

In 2014, he was included in the  side that participated in the 2014 Vodacom Cup.

References

South African rugby union players
Living people
1988 births
Griffons (rugby union) players
Boland Cavaliers players
Rugby union players from Bloemfontein
Rugby union fly-halves